The 2011 Italian Formula Three Championship was the 47th Italian Formula Three Championship season. The season began on 15 May on the new for the championship Autodromo di Franciacorta and ended on 16 October at Monza after 16 races held at eight meetings.

With victories at Spa, Vallelunga, Sergio Campana of BVM – Target Racing finished the season as champion, becoming third driver in row to win championship for this team. He finished seventeen points clear of Prema Powerteam driver Michael Lewis, who won rookie championship and three races during the season. Third place went to his teammate and Ferrari Driver Academy driver Raffaele Marciello, who took two victories at Misano and Adria International Raceway. Fourth place in the championship was claimed by another Ferrari Driver Academy driver. BVM – Target Racing's Brandon Maïsano won races at Vallelunga as well as opening round at Franciacorta, while fifth went to double race-winner Edoardo Liberati from Lucidi Motors. Daniel Mancinelli took the other race victory on opening race at Franciacorta for RP Motorsport.

Teams and drivers
 All cars are powered by FPT engines, and will run on Kumho tyres.

Race calendar and results
 An eight-round calendar was announced on 21 November 2010.

Championship standings

Drivers' Championship
Points are awarded as follows:

Teams' Championship

Rookies' Championship

References

External links
 Official Website

Italian Formula Three Championship seasons
Formula Three
Italy
Italian Formula 3 Championship